See also Keystone Hotel (disambiguation)

Keystone Hotel (1935) is a two-reel comedy short subject, directed by Ralph Staub and released by the Vitaphone Corporation through Warner Bros. Pictures. Inspired by the silent comedies produced by Mack Sennett, the film reunites many of Sennett's former stars.

Plot
The story follows the cross-eyed Count Drewa Blanc (Ben Turpin), who arrives at the busy Keystone Hotel to judge a fashion show.

In the hotel lobby, the chief of police (Ford Sterling), the mayor (Chester Conklin), and a gangster (Dewey Robinson) try to sway the Count's decision. Upstairs, the house detective (Hank Mann) investigates some marital shenanigans, some involving a vibrating exercise machine.

The fashion show is held in a banquet hall, where the hotel manager (Bert Roach) introduces the contestants. The winner is chosen, but the myopic Count awards the trophy to the wrong woman. The winner protests, "How dare you give it to her when I should get it!" She does—an airborne pie misses its target and hits her. This prompts a huge pie fight, and the hotel detective sends for the Keystone Kops. The Kops spring into action and encounter several detours and difficulties before crashing into the hotel.

Keystone Hotel was staged so effectively that later silent-comedy tribute films have included footage from Keystone Hotel without the soundtrack as an "authentic" Keystone comedy. The film was so successful that Warner Bros. wanted to make a series with the same principals, but the actors' agents demanded too much money so the idea was abandoned. Keystone Hotel was reissued to theaters in 1947 and to the home-movie market in 1967.

Cast
 Ford Sterling
 Ben Turpin
 Chester Conklin
 Hank Mann
 Marie Prevost
 Vivien Oakland
 Dewey Robinson
 The Keystone Kops

External links 
 

1935 films
Vitaphone short films
Warner Bros. short films
1935 comedy films
American black-and-white films
1935 short films
American comedy short films
1930s American films